The Oregon Health & Science University School of Dentistry is the dental school of Oregon Health & Science University. It is located in the city of Portland, Oregon, United States. It is the only dental school in Oregon.

History 

Oregon Health & Science University School of Dentistry is a part of Oregon Health & Science University. The school was established in 1899 when the Oregon College of Dentistry merged with the Tacoma College of Dental Surgery to create the North Pacific Dental College in Portland. After being renamed as North Pacific College, that school merged into the then University of Oregon Medical School in 1945.

After the merger, a controversy arose over the relationship between the dental school and the university. Eventually members of the Oregon State Dental Association sued the Oregon State Board of Higher Education for a declaratory judgment on the interpretation of the law that created the merger. The issue was whether the dental school was a subdivision of (the former )  Oregon University System, or was it a subdivision of the University of Oregon. In 1954, the Oregon Supreme Court ruled that the dental college was a subdivision of the higher education system.

Phillip Marucha was named the schools ninth dean in April 2013, replacing Jack Clinton. In 2014, the School moved into the Collaborative Life Sciences Building & Skourtes Tower on OHSU's South Waterfront campus.

Academics 
Oregon Health & Science University School of Dentistry awards following degrees:
Doctor of Dental Medicine

Departments 
Oregon Health & Science University School of Dentistry includes the following departments:
Department of Community Dentistry  
Department of Endodontics 
Department of Integrative Biosciences
Department of Oral & Maxillofacial Surgery 
Department of Orthodontics 	
Department of Pathology & Radiology 
Department of Pediatric Dentistry 	
Department of Periodontics 	
Department of Restorative Dentistry

Accreditation 
Oregon Health & Science University School of Dentistry is accredited by American Dental Association through the Commission on Dental Accreditation.

See also

American Student Dental Association

References 

1899 establishments in Oregon
Dental schools in Oregon
Educational institutions established in 1899
Homestead, Portland, Oregon
Oregon Health & Science University